The Tuula Puputti Award is an ice hockey trophy awarded seasonally by the Finnish Ice Hockey Association to the best goaltender of the Naisten Liiga and its predecessor, the Naisten SM-sarja. It is named after Tuula Puputti, the first Olympic goaltender of the Finnish women's national team and current general manager of the Finnish women's national ice hockey program. Best goaltender in the Naisten SM-saija was first awarded in the 2005–06 season, to Maija Hassinen-Sullanmaa of Ilves Naiset. The award was named in honor of Tuula Puputti during the 2010–11 season. 

Only three players have won the award more than once: Meeri Räisänen, Maija Hassinen-Sullanmaa, and Anni Keisala, and both Hassinen-Sullanmaa and Keisala hold the record for most wins, with four each. Räisänen has been named best goaltender three times, twice with JYP Jyväskylä, in 2013 and 2014, and with HPK Kiekkonaiset in 2018. Hassinen-Sullanmaa won the trophy in 2006 and 2008 with the Tampereen Ilves Naiset and in 2009 and 2011 with HPK Kiekkonaiset. The current titleholder is Anni Keisala of the Tampereen Ilves, who received the honor for the fourth time in the 2021–22 Naisten Liiga season. She was previously awarded while playing with Team Kuortane in 2015 and 2016, the only Team Kuortane player to ever earn the commendation, and in 2021 while playing with the Tampereen Ilves.

Award winners 

Sources: Elite Prospects

All time award recipients

References

Naisten Liiga (ice hockey) trophies and awards
Ice hockey goaltender awards